Halston Sage (born May 10, 1993) is an American actress. She is known for her television roles, such as Grace on the Nickelodeon series How to Rock (2012), Amber on the NBC series Crisis (2014), Alara Kitan on the Fox series The Orville (2017–2019), and Ainsley Whitly on the Fox television series Prodigal Son (2019–2021). Sage has also appeared in films, playing Lacey in Paper Towns and Kendall in Scouts Guide to the Zombie Apocalypse, both from 2015, and Lindsay in the 2017 film Before I Fall.

Early life
Sage was born and raised in Los Angeles, California. She has a younger brother and a younger sister. Sage is Jewish. She rode horses competitively, and was the editor of her high school's newspaper.

Career

Television
Sage's career was launched in 2011, when she was cast in the role of Grace on the Nickelodeon series How to Rock, which first aired on February 4, 2012, and ran for a single 25-episode season. She has also guest starred on Nickelodeon's Victorious and Bucket & Skinner's Epic Adventures. In February 2013, Sage was cast in the short-lived NBC television thriller series Crisis, playing Amber, the daughter of Gillian Anderson's character. In 2016 she was cast in a starring role as Alara Kitan on the science-fiction dramedy series The Orville, which premiered on Fox on September 10, 2017. It was reported in January 2019 that Sage had left the cast of The Orville after the episode "Home", though her departure was considered open-ended for a possible return in the future.

Film
Sage appeared as Brianna in the 2012 teen drama The First Time. In 2013, she appeared in the films The Bling Ring, Grown Ups 2 and Poker Night. She had a role in the 2014 film Neighbors, playing  Zac Efron character's girlfriend Brooke Shy. Sage was a nominee for the MTV Movie Award "Best Kiss" for her onscreen kiss with Rose Byrne in Neighbors.

In 2015, Sage played Lacey Pemberton in the film Paper Towns. Also that year, she co-starred in Sony Pictures' Goosebumps, and was cast in the role of Kendall in Paramount's Scouts Guide to the Zombie Apocalypse which centers on a group of Boy Scouts who rise to the occasion as their small town is faced with a zombie outbreak. In 2017, she played another popular high school girl, Lindsay Edgecomb, in Before I Fall.

In 2016, Sage filmed her role in the dramatic comedy People You May Know, and was cast in the thriller film You Get Me. In 2018 she was cast in The Last Summer. She has a cameo appearance in the 2019 film Dark Phoenix playing the role of Dazzler. In 2021, Sage executive produced and starred in the independent comedy film The List.

Filmography

Film

Television

Music videos
 "Beggin' on Your Knees" (2011) by Victoria Justice, as Sadie
 "Loving You Easy" (2015) by Zac Brown Band, as Main Beautiful Girl

Video game
 The Quarry (2022), as Emma Mountebank (voice, performance capture, and likeness)

References

External links
 
 

1993 births
Actresses from Los Angeles
American child actresses
American child singers
American film actresses
American television actresses
Jewish American actresses
Living people
21st-century American actresses
21st-century American singers
21st-century American women singers
21st-century American Jews